The Samsung NX mini is a digital rangefinder-style interchangeable lens mirrorless camera announced by Samsung on March 19, 2014.

Design features
The NX mini features a self-portrait mode where flipping the rear screen to face forward turns the camera on, and a wink will start a two-second countdown timer to shutter release. Photographs may be shared via flickr and Dropbox when the NX mini is connected using its onboard Wi-Fi, or transmitted to compatible smartphones through NFC.

NX Mini 2

In June 2015, rumors were circulated of a NX mini 2. Based on leaked specifications, the NX mini 2 would feature high-resolution 4K video recording and interchangeable front covers. It would use the same sensor with an AMOLED rear screen and a battery with slightly less capacity (1820 mAh versus 2330 mAh).

Lenses
The NX mini uses a 1" sensor, giving it a 2.7x crop factor relative to 35mm. It uses the Samsung NX-M lens mount with a register of 6.95 mm, which is among the shortest in existence. An adaptor (ED-MA4NXM) may be separately purchased to mount larger lenses using the Samsung NX-mount, which is designed for an APS-C sensor.

Notes

See also
Samsung NX-mount
 Nikon 1 series, a competing interchangeable-lens system with 1"-sensors (branded Nikon CX format)

References

External links

http://www.dpreview.com/products/samsung/slrs/samsung_nxmini/specifications
 

NX Mini
Live-preview digital cameras